Alix Boyd Knights is a Dominican politician and attorney who was the Speaker of the House of Assembly from 2000 to 2020.  

Boyd Knights was first elected Speaker on 17 April 2000 and was re-elected on 27 July 2005, 4 February 2010 and 20 February 2015.  Upon her election to a third term on 4 February 2010, she became the longest serving Speaker in Dominica's history.

She has a Bachelor of Laws degree from University of the West Indies.

References

External links
.

Year of birth missing (living people)
Living people
Dominica Labour Party politicians
Speakers of the House of Assembly of Dominica
Dominica women in politics
Dominica lawyers
Dominica women lawyers
University of the West Indies alumni